Cucumber Quest is an adventure webcomic written and illustrated by Gigi D.G. since April 3, 2011. The comic features the character Cucumber and his sister Almond traveling across a fictional world in order to defeat the Nightmare Knight, meeting various friends and foes on the way. The childfriendly comic has multiple volumes in print thanks to crowdfunding.

Plot and setting

Sporting a "bright, candy-colored look" and featuring "adorably rendered" bunny people dressed in the style of food, Cucumber Quest tells the story of Cucumber, a young boy that simply wants to go to "magic school," but is forced into heroism as the magical land is in danger and his father is captured. Together with his more heroically-inclined sister Almond, the cowardly Sir Carrot and the energetic Princess Nautilus, Cucumber travels the fantasy world to collect signatures of the princesses of each of the six kingdoms of Dreamside, meeting various eccentric characters on the way.

Development
Cucumber Quest is Gigi D.G.'s second major webcomic project - their first being Hiimdaisy, a gag-a-day webcomic that provided bizarre twists to various video games. Hiimdaisy is no longer officially available, but the video game influence has persisted in Cucumber Quest. Though not explicitly referring to gaming, Cucumber Quest is influenced by Kirby and Paper Mario, making use of various video game tropes. In an interview with io9, Gigi D.G. stated that they came up with the earliest idea for what would eventually become Cucumber Quest while playing video games as a child, and they noted that setting the story against a typical "hero's journey" backdrop allowed them to subvert many reader expectations and provided them with many opportunities for humor while driving the story further.

While attempting to raise 10,000 USD through Kickstarter to self-publish the first volume of Cucumber Quest in 2012, Gigi D.G. made 62,953 USD long before the deadline of the campaign. Multiple printed volumes have been released. In October 2017, First Second Books began publishing a new physical release of Cucumber Quest.

In 2016, Gigi D.G. made a new one-shot webcomic, titled Lady of the Shard. The infinite canvas webcomic, which was heavily praised by Zachary Clemente on Comics Beat, is—in stark contrast to Cucumber Quests rich color palettes—deliberately limited to two or three colors at a time.

In 2019, Gigi D.G. announced that Cucumber Quest would not be continuing as a comic, but would eventually be concluded in illustrated script format, citing changing circumstances in their personal life.

Reception
Larry Cruz of Comic Book Resources has praised Cucumber Quest for its humor and art style. While noting that its "story is fun and more polished than a lot of webcomics," Cruz states that he'd recommend the comic for its art alone. Lauren Davis of io9 stated that it is easy to think of Cucumber Quest as a "children's comic," but that it has a lot "sly moments" that raise interesting questions in the reader.

Davis listed Cucumber Quest among 51 webcomics that should have been nominated for an Eisner award, but never have, as well as their "top 10 webcomics that would make incredible TV shows," noting it would fit in well with animated shows such as Adventure Time and Steven Universe. Storyboard artist of Cartoon Network series We Bare Bears, Louie Zong, has stated that reading Cucumber Quest inspired him to become an artist.

References

2010s webcomics
2011 webcomic debuts
Adventure webcomics
American comedy webcomics
Coming-of-age webcomics
Fantasy parodies
Fantasy webcomics
First Second Books books
Kickstarter-funded publications
LGBT-related webcomics
Long-form webcomics
Parody webcomics
Webcomics in print
Video game webcomics
Parodies of video games
Unfinished webcomics